On the Moon is a 2020 Russian adventure thriller film directed by Egor Konchalovsky. It was theatrically released in Russia on February 27, 2020.

Plot 
The film tells about the son of an influential man who, during a night race, accidentally hits a pedestrian, as a result of which his father sends him to the northern regions.

Cast

References

External links 
 

2020 films
2020s Russian-language films
2020s adventure thriller films
Russian adventure thriller films
2020 thriller films